Eranhikkal or Eranjikkal is a place in Kozhikode District, Kerala India. It is covered in the Elathur division Of Calicut Municipal Corporation. Conolly Canal meets with the Korapuhha River in Eranhikkal. It is situated just 8 km from Calicut City.

National Highway NH 17 passes through Pavangad just 2 km From Eranhikkal and the NH 17 Calicut bypass also passes through Eranhikkal. The nearest railway stations are Calicut Railway Station, Westhill Railway station, and the Elathur Railway Station.

Conolly Canal 
Conolly Canal, named after Henry Valentine Conolly, the collector of Malabar during the British regime, runs through Eranhikkal. It was constructed during his tenure, in 1848, and was used as a major waterway, shipping goods and ferrying passengers in the Calicut district till the late 1950s. It connects Korapuzha to Kallayi River.

Educational institutions 
There are many primary schools, including Govt Upper Primary School, Karannur U P School, Hidayathul Islam L P School, and secondary and higher secondary education served by P V S Higher Secondary School.

References

Villages in Kozhikode district
Kozhikode north